Bryant-Lake Bowl, locally nicknamed BLB, is a bowling alley, restaurant, bar, and 90-seat theatre in the Uptown neighborhood of Minneapolis, Minnesota. Best known for its evening entertainment and Cheap Date Night specials (two meals, drinks, and a round of bowling for $28) BLB is also a reliable brunch stop. The theatre is a venue for cabaret and wide variety of other stage productions. It is a host of the annual Minnesota Fringe Festival.

Originally a garage, the building was converted into a bowling alley in 1936. In 1959, Minnesota bowling champion Bill Drouches bought the bowling alley. Kim Bartmann bought the business in 1993, restoring the building, opening a restaurant, and converting the game room into a 90-seat theatre. In 2018, Bryant-Lake Bowl was sold by Bartmann to longtime employee Erica Gilbert.

In 2004, Bryant-Lake Bowl hosted the signing ceremony for a city ordinance making Minneapolis restaurants and bars free of tobacco smoke.

Bryant-Lake Bowl was featured in a 2008 episode of Food Network's Diners, Drive-Ins and Dives, hosted by Guy Fieri.

In 2021, Bryant-Lake Bowl released an 87 second promotional video called Right Up Our Alley, made in one continuous shot by drone operator Jay Christensen, which went viral and garnered praise from several critics.

References

External links 
 Official website
 An interview with Kim Bartmann about the history of Bryant-Lake Bowl

Restaurants in Minnesota
Bowling alleys